Andrew Raymond McNeilly (born February 1972) is a Trinidad and Tobago bobsledder. He competed for Trinidad and Tobago at the 2002 Winter Olympics.

Early life
McNeilly was born in Toronto, Ontario, Canada and is of Trinidad and Tobago descent.

External links
Sports-Reference
List of Trinidad and Tobago Participants in the Olympic Games, 1948 to Present
2002 Olympic Two-Man Bobsleigh Results

1972 births
Sportspeople from Toronto
Citizens of Trinidad and Tobago through descent
Canadian male bobsledders
Trinidad and Tobago male bobsledders
Canadian sportspeople of Trinidad and Tobago descent
Olympic bobsledders of Trinidad and Tobago
Bobsledders at the 2002 Winter Olympics
Living people